The PULSE Institute (PULSE) is an independent laboratory of Stanford University, founded in 2005 for the purpose of advancing research in ultrafast science, with particular emphasis on research using the Linac Coherent Light Source at the SLAC National Accelerator Laboratory.  Recent research programs include Terahertz radiation (sometimes called T-rays) ultrafast studies and attosecond pulse studies.  It is housed in the Central Laboratory on the grounds of SLAC, and also utilizes some laboratory space on the main Stanford campus nearby.  Philip H. Bucksbaum was named as the first director of PULSE. In 2019 David A. Reis became the PULSE director.

See also 
 SLAC National Accelerator Laboratory
 Stanford University Research Centers and Institutes

References

External links 
 Official PULSE Institute Homepage
 SLAC Homepage
 Research publications from the PULSE Institute

Laboratories in California
PULSE
University and college laboratories in the United States
Research institutes  in the San Francisco Bay Area
Research institutes established in 2005
2005 establishments in California